Andre Begemann and Julian Knowle were the defending champions, but chose not to participate together. Begemann played alongside Florian Mayer, but lost in the first round to Dustin Brown and Jan-Lennard Struff. Knowle teamed up with Vasek Pospisil, but lost in the first round to Eric Butorac and Scott Lipsky.
Raven Klaasen and Rajeev Ram won the title, defeating Rohan Bopanna and Florin Mergea in the final, 7–6(7–5), 6–2.
The world's no.1 doubles pairing, the Bryan Brothers, were originally slated to play the event.  This would have been the Bryans' first-ever appearance at Halle, after over a decade of playing in the Queen's Club Championships prior to Wimbledon.  However, the Bryans withdrew just prior to the start of the tournament.

Seeds

Draw

Draw

Qualifying

Seeds

Qualifiers
  Lukáš Rosol /  Sergiy Stakhovsky

Qualifying draw

References
 Main Draw

Gerry Weber Open - Doubles
2015 Gerry Weber Open